Igor Prijić (born 30 September 1989) is a Croatian football striker who plays for the Croatian Third Football League club Marsonia 1909. Prijić started his professional career with NK Osijek, from where he was sent on loan to Pomorac and Marsonia, before he was transferred in Segesta Sisak in 2012. He made his international debut for Croatia youth football national teams in 2007.

Club career
Born in the town of Osijek, Croatia, Prijić started his career as a teenager in the Prva HNL at age 19, debuting for Osijek against Šibenik on 23 February 2008. According to Tomislav Steinbrückner, Igor's coach in junior categories, and later in the senior team, Igor was supposed to be key player in NK Osijek. Unfortunately due to some non football issues  he never got a real chance in his home club. After loans in Pomorac and Marsonia in season 2012/2013, Igor was transferred in Segesta Sisak.

International career
Great talent who possessed then 18-year-old Igor, brought him the call in Croatia U18 national football team. Debut in the national U18 team he had on 22 May 2007. against  Bosnia and Herzegovina in Orašje. Because of the great games he received a call for  Croatia national under-19 football team for which he had 4 appearances and three goals. He played in Qualification  tournament for 2008 UEFA European Under-19 Football Championship, and he scores against Germany and Albania.

New beginning in Segesta
At the beginning of  2012/2013 season, Hrvoje Braović (Segesta's coach) was decide to hire Prijić. Igor's debut for Segesta was on 8 September 2012 against Udarnik Kurilovec. In the next game, on 12 September, popular Prija is enrolled in history of Croatian football. He scored the fastest hat-trick in  history of modern football. Only 3 minutes and 45 seconds it took him to score three goals against NK Dubrava. Throughout the season Igor was played 27 games for Segesta, and scores incredible 37 goals.

External links
 hnl-statistika.com Prijić statistics (Croatian)
 sportnews-hr.info Prijić interview (Croatian)
 

1989 births
Living people
Sportspeople from Osijek
Association football forwards
Croatian footballers
Croatia youth international footballers
NK Osijek players
NK Pomorac 1921 players
NK Marsonia players
HNK Segesta players
HNK Cibalia players
HNK Šibenik players
NK Dugopolje players
NK Lučko players
NK Vinogradar players
Croatian Football League players
First Football League (Croatia) players
Second Football League (Croatia) players